James Leslie Gideon (born September 26, 1953) is a former Major League Baseball pitcher who played for one season. He pitched for the Texas Rangers for one game on September 14 during the 1975 season.

External links

1953 births
Living people
Baseball players from Texas
Gold Coast Suns (baseball) players
Gulf Coast Rangers players
Major League Baseball pitchers
Orlando Twins players
People from Taylor, Texas
Sacramento Solons players
Spokane Indians players
Tacoma Tigers players
Tacoma Twins players
Texas Longhorns baseball players
Texas Rangers players
Tulsa Drillers players
Visalia Oaks players
All-American college baseball players
National College Baseball Hall of Fame inductees